Vogue Scandinavia is the Scandinavian edition of the American fashion and lifestyle monthly magazine Vogue. The magazine has been published since August 2021 and is the twenty-sixth local edition of Vogue.

History 
In June 2020, Vogue launched a Scandinavian edition of the magazine, with Martina Bonnier being the Editor-in-Chief, featuring Scandinavian fashion as well covering politics of the Nordic region. It was announced that the magazine would be published in English, so it would be accessible worldwide. It was also revealed that in effort to be more sustainable, the magazine would be the first edition of Vogue not to be sold in physical shops. In May 2021, Vogue Scandinavia opened a digital flagship store.

The first issue was released on August 2021, with Greta Thunberg, a Swedish environmental activist, on its cover. In February 2022, Prince Nikolai of Denmark appeared on the fourth issue of the magazine.

See also 
 List of Vogue Scandinavia cover models

References

External links 
 

Condé Nast magazines
Fashion websites
Lifestyle magazines
Magazines established in 2020
Online magazines
Women's fashion magazines
Vogue (magazine)